Luis Schuster (born 10 May 2001) is a German pair skater. With his skating partner, Letizia Roscher, he is the 2022 MK John Wilson Trophy bronze medalist.

On the junior level, Roscher/Schuster are three-time German junior national champions and placed fifth at the 2022 World Junior Figure Skating Championships.

Personal life 
Schuster was born on 10 May 2001 in Sebnitz.

Programs

With Roscher

Competitive highlights 
GP: Grand Prix; CS: ISU Challenger Series; JGP: Junior Grand Prix

With Roscher

References

External links 

 

2001 births
Living people
German male pair skaters
People from Sebnitz
Figure skaters at the 2020 Winter Youth Olympics